The British women's national ice hockey team represents Great Britain at the International Ice Hockey Federation's IIHF World Women's Championships. The women's national team is controlled by Ice Hockey UK. As of 2011, Great Britain has 476 female players.

History
From 1989 to 1997, the British women's national team competed in the European Championships. After 1999, the team has competed in the IIHF World Women's Championships. At present, Great Britain play in Division II. In 1989, Team GB re-entered the World of International Hockey, with a European Championship two-leg qualifying match against the Netherlands in Chelmsford. GB battled hard in both games but were defeated by an experienced Dutch side, winning both games by the margin of four goals to two, giving the Dutch an 8–4 aggregate win and a place in the European Championship.
 Below is a guide to GB's performances year by year from 1989 to 2005. Only 'competitive' games (challenge matches ignored) are counted for the records.

1990s
No official competitions existed in  1990, however GB defeated the Dutch in Amsterdam 1–0 in a challenge match. In  1991, Team GB took part in the 1991 European Championship finishing 9th out of 10 teams. Placed in a very tough Group B, they lost their first three games to Sweden (0–16), Denmark (0–4) and Germany (0–6) before surprising the Czech Republic with a 2–2 draw in their final game. GB finished bottom of their group, and played Holland in the 9th/10th playoff which they won 3–0.

After the break for an Olympic year, GB started  1993 in the newly formed World Championship Pool B. Following an opening loss against Latvia (0–3), GB repeated their performance against the Czech Republic from two years ago, this time with a 1–1 draw. France, dispatched GB easily in the third game by 7 goals to 2, and GB won their first International game in the final match of the tournament with a 1–0 win over Ukraine. giving GB a respectable 4th-placed finish out of 5 teams, with GB only missing a medal by one point.

GB went to Denmark, for the IIHF World Women's Championships Pool B in March  1995, and faced a tough group on paper and proved to be a tough group on ice. GB fell to their worst defeat in 4 years, in the opening game with a 14–1 defeat to Denmark. Slovakia defeated GB 4–1 and in the final group game Holland put seven past the Brits, with only two coming back.

The 7th/8th playoff game saw GB take on Ukraine, the only side they had beaten in competitive hockey so far. Ukraine skated to a 2–0 victory which saw GB finish 8th out of 8 teams.

A trip to Slovakia was in store for GB in Pool B in 1996. GB started positively with a much better account against Denmark who they had been routed against the previous year falling only to a 5–0 defeat. They lost in their 2nd game against the Danes who GB had previously done well against collapsing to a 7–1 defeat. That scoreline was repeated in the final group round game against the Dutch to leave GB adrift at the bottom of their group.

The 7th/8th playoff saw GB take on Kazakhstan and for the first time in the tournament, team GB took the game to their opponents in a thrilling encounter. The Asian side was just able to edge ahead and won by the odd goal in 9 leaving GB in 8th out of 8 place and without a win in two years.

Following a re-structuring in 1999 for the World Championships, (and no championship in 1998  due to it being an Olympic year), GB finally came back into the new Pool B Qualifying Group to decide the final spot in Pool B for the following year.

In Székesfehérvár, Hungary, Great Britain opened brightly holding Italy to a 1–1 draw after 40 minutes in the opening game before Italy stepping the game up a gear to skate out to a 4–1 victory however the signs looked good. The next game was against the hapless South Africa, which ended to be a sporting contest on the opening puck drop with GB running up their highest ever victory at International level with a 22–0 victory.

After a slow start in the final game GB hit the host team Hungary hard with five quick goals in a match that ended up as 9–1 to the Brits, leaving them finish 2nd out of 4 teams.

2000s
It was back to Hungary in the year  2000, for the Pool B Qualifying Tournament. GB again had a strong start with the Brits 1–1 against the Group Favourites DPR Korea in their first game. Korea struck back with two 2nd period goals but despite a fightback by GB, the game ended up 4–2 to the Asian side.

Australia were next up for GB and we're comfortably dispatched by seven goals to one, and GB finally defeated Holland in a competitive game, 11 years after their first attempt with a comfortable 5–2 victory. GB again finish 2nd out of 4 teams in their group. Belgium, who finished 2nd in the other Group took on GB in the 3rd/4th place playoff. GB, comfortably dispatch the Belgians by 8 goals to 1 which saw GB ranked overall 3rd out of 8 teams.

Pool B was renamed Division 1 in  2001. GB undertook their third straight attempt at Qualification into the 2nd tier. The games were contested at Maribor, Slovenia and GB looked to their first game against host Slovenia to set the standard for the tournament. Up by a 5–0 score after 20 minutes they went on to win 12–0. Hungary also fell to a GB by 12 goals to 0 the in Game Two, and with GB dispatching the Aussies by 4–2 in Game 3. The club was in a situation of winning three games in just as many games played, while scoring 28 goals, and only allowing two.

Slovakia who were Group favourites took on GB in the final game. Slovakia just were too good for Team GB, who despite getting a goal back in the 3rd, went down to a 4–1 defeat and finished 2nd in their group for the 3rd consecutive year.

An Olympic year (2002 ) saw no official hockey taking place, but the IIHF hosted a Women's challenge tri-series between Italy, Belgium and GB, held in Hull, England. GB beat Belgium, but fell to Italy to finish 2nd in the three team group.

In  2003, GB was off to Lecco, Italy for Division 2 competition. The division now sported 6 teams in direct parity with the Men's game for the first time.

GB collapsed to in the start against Slovakia, as they were down 5–0 after the 1st period and ended up losing 8–1 to the Eastern Bloc side. Game 2 against group favourites Norway was just as tough for the Brits along a spirited performance saw them just 1–0 down after the first GB collapsed to an 8–3 defeat.

Game 3 against Denmark saw a pulsating clash from end to end which saw GB register their first points with a 4–4 draw, however after leading the Danes 1–0 at the end of the 1st. The Netherlands, a long term bogey team of the Brits skated to a 4–2 win over GB. GB's final game against Italy proved too much for them and they were defeated as they were the previous year to an experienced Italian side, this time 4–2.

And so GB were relegated. Or so we thought. GB however had the dubious honour of being saved by a life-threatening disease, as due to the SARS pandemic in China the World Championships were cancelled for that year and the IIHF didn't relegate any teams from any divisions.

From a standings point of view, the  2004 saw GB's worst ever performance from International Ice Hockey, with defeats to Denmark, Italy, Slovakia, the Netherlands and Australia. GB were relegated to Division 3 along with Australia.

 In  2005, Division III was the setting for GB. GB started off the tournament in Cape Town, South Africa as they dispatched Hungary by a 5–0 tally, followed by an 11–0 demolition of Belgium. In the third game, GB went a goal down at 26:56 before Newcastle's Teresa Lewis opened the account for GB on the half-hour mark.

With the scores neatly tied at 1 heading into the final period, University of New Hampshire's Angela Taylor picked up a penalty for highsticking at 47:39. With eight seconds left, Slovenia took the lead. GB lost 4–1 with the final goal placed into the empty net.

Game 4 of the 2005 tournament saw GB prevail with a 19–0 victory over the host nation, South Africa. The South African team suffered a relegation to Division IV. The final game saw GB record a 6–2 victory over Australia to ensure GB's 2nd-place finish.

Tournament record

Olympic Games
Great Britain team has never qualified for an Olympic tournament.

World Championship

European Championship

Team

References

External links

IIHF profile
National Teams of Ice Hockey

 
Women's national ice hockey teams in Europe